Johann August Eduard Mandel (1810-1882) was a German engraver.

He was born at Berlin in 1810, and early received encouragement from King Frederick William III. He entered the academy in 1826, and worked under Professor Buchhorn. Inconsequence of the success of his first work,' The Warrior and his Daughter,' after Hildebrand, in 1830, he was appointed by the academy to engrave the 'Loreley' after Regass. In the same year he obtained a third class medal at Paris, and in 1844 a second class.  In 1855 he sent to the Paris Universal Exhibition, 'Christ weeping over Jerusalem,' after Ary Schefier, the 'Portrait of Frederick William TV. after Otto; 'Two Children,' after Magnus, and his famous 'Portrait of Charles I,' after Vandyke; and was rewarded with a medal of the first class. He was appointed professor of engraving in 1842.
Mandel was born in Berlin. He studied from 1824 with the map engraver Johann Karl Mare, and from 1826 to 1830 in the studio of Ludwig Buchhorn. His first engraving was a portrait of Friedrich Wilhelm III after his own design (1830). He completed his first larger work in 1835, Der Krieger und sein Kind, after a painting by Theodor Hildebrandt; it was so well received that he was assigned by the Prussian Art Association to make an engraving after Lurlei by Carl Joseph Begas (completed 1839). In 1837, he was appointed a member of the Akademie der Künste. In 1840 he traveled to Paris, to study further with Louis Pierre Henriquel-Dupont and Auguste Gaspard Louis Desnoyers, among others. While there, he produced the engraving Italienischen Hirtenknaben after a painting by Pollack. After his return he produced a series of engravings considered among the finest in 19th-century German engraving. He was head of the engraving studio at the Akademie der Künste from 1856. His most important work, done shortly before his death, was an engraving after the Sistine Madonna of Raphael.

Engravings
 Portrait of Friedrich Wilhelm III (1830)
 Der Krieger und sein Kind, after Theodor Hildebrandt (1835)
 Lurlei, after Carl Joseph Begas (1839)
 Italienischen Hirtenknaben, after Pollack (1840)
 Self-portrait, after Anthony van Dyck (1841)
 Self-portrait, after Titian (1843)
 Portraits of Friedrich Wilhelm IV and Elisabeth Ludovika of Bavaria
 Portrait of Charles I of England (1850)
 Several portraits of Frederick the Great
 Madonna Colonna, after Raphael (1855)
 Ecce homo, after Guido Reni (1858)
 Portrait of a young Raphael (1860)
 Madonna della Sedia, after Raphael (1865)
 La Bella, after Titian (1868)
 Panshanger Madonna, after Raphael (1872)
 Maria und Johannes, after Bernhard Plockhorst
 Die Ehebrecherin, after Bernhard Plockhorst
 Sistine Madonna, after Raphael

References

Note
 This article, or an earlier version, was translated from an article in the 4th edition of the Meyers Konversations-Lexikon, a publication now in the public domain.

1810 births
1882 deaths
German engravers
Artists from Berlin
Recipients of the Pour le Mérite (civil class)